Capaha Field is a baseball venue in Cape Girardeau, Missouri, United States.  It is home to the Southeast Missouri State Redhawks college baseball team of the NCAA Division I Ohio Valley Conference.  The field is located two blocks away from the Southeast Missouri State campus.  It has a capacity of 2,000 spectators and is also home to the Prospect League summer collegiate Cape Catfish, the amateur Cape Capahas baseball team and local youth American Legion baseball.

Capaha Field underwent a $1.8 million renovation that featured all-new synthetic turf. Other upgrades to the facility included a brand-new scoreboard equipped with a video board, a new outfield fence, new bullpens, as well as other cosmetic upgrades including new paint and fencing all around the field. Capaha Field includes a state-of-the-art press box which was completed prior to the start of the 2006 season. The press box, which is fully equipped with wireless broadband internet access, televisions, a kitchen/lounge area and restroom, gives staff and media an excellent view behind home plate.

See also
 List of NCAA Division I baseball venues

References

College baseball venues in the United States
Baseball venues in Missouri
Southeast Missouri State Redhawks baseball
Buildings and structures in Cape Girardeau, Missouri
Sports venues in Missouri